Caroline Casaretto (born 24 May 1978 in Krefeld, North Rhine-Westphalia) is a retired female field hockey midfielder from Germany, who won the gold medal with the German National Women's Team at the 2004 Summer Olympics in Athens.

International Senior Tournaments

 1999 – Champions Trophy, Brisbane (3rd place)
 1999 – European Nations Cup, Cologne (2nd place)
 2000 – Olympic Qualifying Tournament, Milon Keynes (3rd place)
 2000 – Champions Trophy, Amstelveen (2nd place)
 2000 – Summer Olympics, Sydney (7th place)
 2003 – Champions Challenge, Catania (1st place)
 2003 – European Nations Cup, Barcelona (3rd place)
 2004 – Summer Olympics, Athens (1st place)

References

External links
 
 
 

1978 births
Living people
German female field hockey players
Olympic field hockey players of Germany
Field hockey players at the 2000 Summer Olympics
Field hockey players at the 2004 Summer Olympics
Olympic gold medalists for Germany
Sportspeople from Krefeld
Olympic medalists in field hockey
Medalists at the 2004 Summer Olympics